Hovea linearis is a species of flowering plant in the family Fabaceae and is endemic to eastern Australia. It is an erect or trailing subshrub with mostly narrowly linear to linear leaves with stipules at the base, and mauve and yellowish-green, pea-like flowers.

Description
The leaves are more or less erect, the upper surface glabrous and the lower surface with soft hairs pressed against the surface.

Taxonomy
This species was first formally described in 1808 by James Edward Smith, who gave it the name Poiretia linearis in Transactions of the Linnean Society of London. In 1812, Robert Brown changed the name to Hovea linearis in William Aiton's Hortus Kewensis.

Distribution and habitatHovea linearis'' grows in forest and woodland, mainly between Newcastle and Nowra in eastern New South Wales, but it is also known from the Blackdown Tableland in south-eastern Queensland.

References

linearis
Flora of New South Wales
Flora of Queensland
Fabales of Australia
Plants described in 1808
Taxa named by James Edward Smith